Esdras Parra (1937 in Santa Cruz de Mora, Venezuela – 2004) was a Venezuelan writer, poet, and trans woman. She was a founding editor of the literary magazine Imagen.

Parras began her career writing short stories and later wrote poetry. Her poetry has been translated into English by Jamie Berrout.  Parra transitioned to a woman in London in the early seventies.

Parras returned to Venezuela in the late seventies.  Due to her transition, she was fired from her job at the Revista Nacional de Cultura and rejected by her family and colleagues. She didn't publish a book after that until 1995, when she published Este suelo secreto, where she discusses  living as a trans woman.

References

1937 births
2004 deaths
Venezuelan women poets
Venezuelan LGBT writers
Transgender poets
Venezuelan short story writers
Venezuelan transgender people
20th-century Venezuelan women writers
20th-century Venezuelan poets
20th-century Venezuelan LGBT people